Red Thunder is a rock band formed in 1990 by frontman Robby Romero, incorporating Native American musical instruments, melody and themes, a style sometimes called by the pun "alter-native". Red Thunder rose to prominence with founder Robby Romero's designation as a United Nations Ambassador of Youth for the Environment in 1990, the heavy rotation of his singles on VH1 and MTV, and the worldwide airing of his social- and environmental-themed films (including America’s Last Frontier, Hidden Medicine and Makoce Wakan),

Discography
Robby Romero 
All The Missing Children (1990 Eagle Thunder Records)
Is It Too Late (1990, Eagle Thunder Records)
Red Thunder (1994, Eagle Thunder Records) 	
'Makoce Wakan (1995, Eagle Thunder Records)
Hidden Medicine (1999, Eagle Thunder Records)
Americas Last Frontier (2002, Eagle Thunder Records)
Native Children's Survival (2005, Eagle Thunder Records)
Painting The World (2008, Eagle Thunder Records)
Who's Gonna Save You (2012, Eagle Thunder Records)
Iron Horse (2014, Eagle Thunder Records)
Born On The Rez (2018, Eagle Thunder Records)
25th Anniversary (2019, Eagle Thunder Records)

References

External links

Native American musical groups
Musical groups established in 1990